The Philadelphia Experiment is a 1984 American science fiction film. It is directed by Stewart Raffill and stars Michael Paré, Bobby Di Cicco, Kene Holliday and Nancy Allen and based on the urban legend of the Philadelphia Experiment. In 1943,  United States Navy sailors David Herdeg (Paré) and Jim Parker (Di Cicco) are thrown forward in time to the year 1984 when a scientific experiment being performed aboard the USS Eldridge suffers a catastrophe. The film follows the two men as they attempt to survive the future and race against time to put an end to the experiment that now threatens the fate of the entire world.

Plot
In 1943, United States Navy sailors David Herdeg and Jim Parker serve aboard destroyer escort USS Eldridge, docked in Philadelphia. Doctor James Longstreet and his team conduct an experiment to render the ship invisible to radar, but a malfunction causes the ship to disappear. David and Jim's attempts to stop the experiment fail and they jump overboard to escape.

They land during the night in a small town, which also disappears, leaving them marooned in a desert. Startled by the appearance of an unfamiliar aircraft (a helicopter), they flee and Jim is nearly electrocuted by an electric fence. Eventually, they find their way to a roadside diner. An energy discharge from Jim destroys two arcade games, forcing an altercation with the owner. Fleeing to the parking lot, they take a woman named Allison hostage and force her to drive them away. Confused by their surroundings, they are shocked when Allison tells them that the year is 1984. They are tracked and apprehended by the police. Jim, who is suffering increasingly severe seizures, is hospitalized before disappearing from his hospital bed in a flash of light. David and Allison then evade military police, who have arrived to take David into custody.

Learning that they are near Jim's birthplace, Santa Paula California, David decides to try to find his family. Jim's wife Pamela, who is now a senior citizen, immediately recognizes David from 1943. She says that the Eldridge had reappeared minutes after disappearing. Jim had also returned and had been chastised and hospitalized after telling the truth about temporarily visiting 1984. David finds that he himself never returned. David sees an elderly Jim outside a window but Jim refuses to speak with him. As David and Allison leave, they see military police approaching and a high speed chase through Jim's ranch ensues. The two manage to elude them when the pursuing vehicle crashes and burns. From the burning wreck, David salvages documents mentioning Longstreet. Recognizing that Longstreet had been involved with the Philadelphia experiment in 1943, David decides to find him. As they spend time together, David and Allison fall in love.

In 1984, Longstreet has attempted to use the same technologies that were used in the Eldridge experiment to create a shield as protection from an ICBM attack. When the equipment was tested, the shielded town disappeared into "hyperspace". The scientists are unable to shut down the experiment, which has created a vortex that is drawing matter into it and causes extremely unstable and severe weather. Longstreet predicts that the vortex will continue to expand until the entire world is consumed. The scientists send a probe into the vortex and discover the Eldridge inside. They theorize that the two experiments have linked together with the generators on the Eldridge powering the vortex.

David captures an assistant at Longstreet's home and forces the man to take them onto the base. Longstreet explains the situation to David and tells him that, according to surviving sailors from the Eldridge, the ship returned to Philadelphia in 1943 after David shut down the generator. Longstreet says that David must go through the vortex to the Eldridge and terminate the experiment or the vortex will destroy the Earth.

David is outfitted with an electrically insulated suit and catapulted into the vortex. He lands on the deck of the Eldridge, where he finds crew members badly injured. He hurries to the generator room and smashes arrays of vacuum tubes using a firefighting axe. The generator shuts down and David looks for Jim. Assured that Jim is fine, David jumps over the side of the ship and disappears. Back in 1943, Longstreet and others watch the Eldridge reappear in Philadelphia, revealing crew members with severe burns, while others have been fused alive into the ship's hull.

In 1984, the missing town reappears as Allison and David are reunited.

Cast
 Michael Paré as David Herdeg
 Nancy Allen as Allison Hayes
 Eric Christmas as Dr. Jim Longstreet
Miles McNamara as Young Jim Longstreet
 Bobby Di Cicco as Jim Parker
Ralph Manza as Older Jim Parker
 Louise Latham as Pamela
Debra Troyer as Young Pamela
 Stephen Tobolowsky as Barney
 Kene Holliday as Major Clark
 Joe Dorsey as Sheriff Bates
 Michael Currie as Magnussen
 Gary Brockette as Adjutant / Andrews
 James Edgcomb as Officer Boyer
 Glenn Morshower as Mechanic
 Vaughn Armstrong as Cowboy

Production

Development and writing
John Carpenter wrote an original draft. He called it a "great shaggy dog story. Absolute crap, but what a great story. While I was writing it, I couldn’t figure out the third act. A friend suggested the revenge of the crew against the people who put them there, but I thought it was too much like The Fog".
 
Stewart Raffill says by the time he became involved with the film, the script had been rewritten nine times. He agreed to do the film, subject to the next rewrite which he thought was "terrible". The head of the studio agreed with Raffill's additions to the script, even though it was only three weeks before filming: "So, he asked if I had ever dictated a screenplay before. I told him I had not. Then he said, "Well, I’m gonna send someone to your house, a girl, every afternoon, and just dictate the story you told me and fill in the dialogue and we’ll make that". And I said, "Okay". So that's what I did".

Principal photography began on November 28, 1983. Parts of the film were shot in Salt Lake City and Wendover, Utah, Denver, Colorado, Santa Paula, California, and Charleston, South Carolina. The destroyer USS Laffey (DD-724), then on display at Patriots Point, represented USS Eldridge in the film. Other shooting locations included Cooper River Bridge, Charleston Harbor, the William Enston Home, Wendover Air Force Base, and the Bonneville Salt Flats.

Reception

Critical response
On Rotten Tomatoes the film has an approval rating of 50% based on reviews from 10 critics.

Accolades
 1985, Nancy Allen was nominated by the Academy of Science Fiction, Fantasy and Horror Films for the Saturn Award for Best Actress.
 1985, Stewart Raffill won the Best Film Award at Fantafestival.

Sequel and remake
 A sequel called Philadelphia Experiment II, featuring a different cast and crew, was released in 1993.
 A made-for-television reconception of the original film was released in 2012 on SyFy. Michael Paré also appears in this version, but in a different role.

See also
 Axis of Time, an alternative history trilogy novel series written by Australian journalist and author John Birmingham beginning in 2004.
 Forever Young – a 1992 time travel through cryostasis film.
 Late for Dinner – a 1991 time travel through cryostasis film.
 Project Rainbow
 The Final Countdown – a 1980 film with a warship traveling back in time.

References

External links

 
 
 
 
 
 

1984 films
Films about conspiracy theories
Films about time travel
American romantic fantasy films
1980s romantic fantasy films
1980s science fiction action films
Films shot in South Carolina
1984 action films
Films set in 1943
Films set in 1984
American science fiction action films
Films directed by Stewart Raffill
Films shot in Salt Lake City
Films shot in Colorado
Films shot in California
New World Pictures films
Films shot in Ventura County, California
Films shot in Utah
1980s English-language films
1980s American films